NAEC may refer to:

 Lakehurst Maxfield Field, an American military base in Ocean County, New Jersey, United States, once known as NAEC Airport
 National Association of Elevator Contractors, an American labor union initially formed in 1950 by a group of Montgomery Elevator distributors
 National Aviation Education Center, an aviation museum in Dallas, Texas, United States
 Nigeria Atomic Energy Commission, an entity within the federal government of Nigeria
 Stoneleigh Park, a business park near Stoneleigh, Warwickshire, England, home to a National Agricultural and Exhibition Centre

See also